Rhogeessa velilla, also called the Ecuadorian little yellow bat, is a species of vesper bat in the genus Rhogeessa. It is found in Northwestern Peru and parts of Ecuador. The species was previously included in R. io, but is now recognized as a separate species. Very little is known about this species, though it is generally considered to be insectivorous.

Taxonomy
Rhogeessa velilla was described as a new species in 1903 by British zoologist Oldfield Thomas. The holotype was collected by Perry O. Simons on Puná Island in 1898. In 1958, George Gilbert Goodwin published that he considered it a subspecies of the little yellow bat (R. parvula). In 1973, R. K. LaVal published that it should instead be considered a subspecies of the black-winged little yellow bat (R. tumida). In 1996, Hugh H. Genoways and Robert James Baker elevated Thomas's yellow bat (R. io) from a subspecies of the black-winged little yellow bat; R. velilla was then considered synonymous with R. io. In 2008, Amy Baird published that R. velilla should be considered a full species, as its karyotype of 2n = 42 differs from R. parvula, R. tumida, and R. io.

Range and habitat
The species is found in Puná Island and the Guayas and El Oro Provinces on the mainland of Ecuador, along with northwestern Peru. There are some protected areas over its distribution, mostly private reserves, but also a Peruvian national park, Cerros de Amotape National Park.

Conservation
As of 2017, it is evaluated as a data deficient species by the IUCN. It meets the criteria for this designation as it was only recently recognized as a full species. Additionally, little information is available on its population and distribution, though it seems locally rare. It might be threatened by habitat destruction, as its range may be restricted to tropical dry forests.

References

velilla
Taxa named by Oldfield Thomas
Mammals described in 1903
Bats of South America